Robin Söderling was the defending champion but couldn't participate.
Juan Martín del Potro won the title by defeating Michaël Llodra 6–4, 6–4 in the final.

Seeds

Draw

Finals

Top half

Bottom half

Qualifying

Seeds

Qualifiers

Draw

First qualifier

Second qualifier

Third qualifier

Fourth qualifier

References
 Main draw
 Qualifying draw

Open 13 - Singles
2012 Singles